Together Again!!!! is an album by trumpeter Howard McGhee and saxophonist Teddy Edwards which was recorded in 1961 and released on the Contemporary label.

Reception

Allmusic awarded the album 3 stars stating "The trumpeter was having a short-lived comeback at the time and he had largely regained his earlier form. Edwards sounds as strong as ever and Newborn was an up-and-coming talent. Their collaboration for this boppish date is generally quite memorable". The Penguin Guide to Jazz Recordings awarded the album four stars, and described it as “one of the best mainstream albums of its day.”

Track listing 
 "Together Again" (Teddy Edwards) - 9:45   
 "You Stepped Out of a Dream" (Nacio Herb Brown, Gus Kahn) - 7:17   
 "Up There" (Ray Brown) - 3:27   
 "Perhaps" (Charlie Parker) - 5:12   
 "Misty" (Johnny Burke, Erroll Garner) - 4:15   
 "Sandy" (Howard McGhee) - 9:50

Personnel 
Howard McGhee - trumpet
Teddy Edwards - tenor saxophone
Phineas Newborn, Jr. - piano
Ray Brown - bass
Ed Thigpen - drums

References 

Howard McGhee albums
Teddy Edwards albums
1961 albums
Contemporary Records albums